Fluoromethamphetamine may refer to:

 2-Fluoromethamphetamine (2-FMA)
 3-Fluoromethamphetamine (3-FMA)
 4-Fluoromethamphetamine (4-FMA)